is a railway station in Komatsu, Ishikawa Prefecture, Japan, operated by West Japan Railway Company (JR West).

Lines
Awazu Station is only served by the Hokuriku Main Line.

Station layout
The station consists of two ground-level island platforms connected by an underground passage. The station is unmanned, but there is an automatic ticket vending machine.

Platforms

History
Awazu Station opened on 16 November 1907. With the privatization of JNR on 1 April 1987, the station came under the control of JR West.

The station became an unstaffed station on 12 March 2022.

Passenger statistics
In fiscal 2015, the station was used by an average of 1,300 passengers daily (boarding passengers only).

Surrounding area
Komatsu College
Awazu onsen

See also
 List of railway stations in Japan

References

External links

  

Stations of West Japan Railway Company
Railway stations in Ishikawa Prefecture
Railway stations in Japan opened in 1907
Hokuriku Main Line
Komatsu, Ishikawa